The 2019 Tim Hortons Brier, Canada's national men's curling championship, was held from March 2 to 10 at Westoba Place in Brandon, Manitoba. In the final, Kevin Koe of Alberta defeated Team Wildcard skipped by Brendan Bottcher 4–3 by scoring two in the tenth end to win. It was the lowest scoring Brier final since 1992, which was held before the adoption of any free guard zone rule.

The Koe rink represented Canada at the 2019 World Men's Curling Championship held from March 30 to April 7 at the ENMAX Centre in Lethbridge, Alberta.

This marked the third time the Brier has been held in Brandon, the first time since 1982.

This year's Brier was notable for a total team shot percentage efficiency for Northern Ontario of 97% during Draw 3 on March 3, tying a Brier record.

Teams
The teams are as follows:

CTRS ranking

Wildcard game
A play-in game was held on Friday, March 1 to determine the wildcard team to round out the tournament field. It was played between the top two teams in the Canadian Team Ranking System standings who lost in their provincial championships: the Leaside Curling Club's John Epping rink from Toronto and the Saville Community Sports Centre's Brendan Bottcher rink from Edmonton. Team Wildcard entered the Brier as the number 3 seed.

CTRS standings for wildcard game

Source:

Wildcard Game
Friday, March 1, 19:00

Round robin standings

Round robin results
All draw times are listed in Central Standard Time (UTC−06:00).

Draw 1
Saturday, March 2, 14:00

Draw 2
Saturday, March 2, 19:00

Draw 3
Sunday, March 3, 09:00

Draw 4
Sunday, March 3, 14:00

Draw 5
Sunday, March 3, 19:00

Draw 6
Monday, March 4, 09:00

Draw 7
Monday, March 4, 14:00

Draw 8
Monday, March 4, 19:00

Draw 9
Tuesday, March 5, 09:00

Draw 10
Tuesday, March 5, 14:00

Draw 11
Tuesday, March 5, 19:00

Draw 12
Wednesday, March 6, 09:00

Draw 13
Wednesday, March 6, 14:00

Draw 14
Wednesday, March 6, 19:00

Championship pool standings
All wins and losses earned in the round robin (including results against teams that failed to advance) were carried forward into the championship pool.

Championship pool results
All draw times are listed in Central Standard Time (UTC−6:00).

Draw 15
Thursday, March 7, 14:00

Draw 16
Thursday, March 7, 19:00

Draw 17
Friday, March 8, 14:00

Draw 18
Friday, March 8, 19:00

Playoffs

1 vs. 2
Saturday, March 9, 19:00

3 vs. 4
Saturday, March 9, 14:00

Semifinal
Sunday, March 10, 13:00

Final
Sunday, March 10, 19:00

Statistics

Top 5 player percentages
Final round robin percentages; minimum 6 games

Perfect games
Round robin and championship pool only

Awards
The awards and all-star teams are listed as follows:

All-Star Teams
First Team
Skip:  Brad Jacobs, Northern Ontario
Third:  Ryan Fry, Northern Ontario
Second:  E.J. Harnden, Northern Ontario
Lead:  Dallan Muyres, Saskatchewan

Second Team
Skip:  Brad Gushue, Team Canada
Third:  B.J. Neufeld, Alberta
Second:  Brett Gallant, Team Canada
Lead:  Colin Hodgson, Manitoba

Ross Harstone Sportsmanship Award
 Darren Moulding, Team Wildcard Third

Hec Gervais Most Valuable Player Award
 Kevin Koe, Alberta Skip

Notes

References

External links

 
Tim Hortons Brier
Curling competitions in Brandon, Manitoba
Tim Hortons Brier
Tim Hortons Brier
The Brier